2011 in Ghana details events of note that happened in Ghana in the year 2011.

Incumbents
 President: John Atta Mills
 Vice President: John Dramani Mahama
 Chief Justice: Georgina Theodora Wood
 Speaker of Parliament: Joyce Bamford-Addo

Events

January
 Ghana sells first oil to Exxon.

February
28 February: Nominations NPP parliamentary primaries open.

March
6 March: Nominations for NPP parliamentary primaries closed.

April

30 April: NPP parliamentary primaries are held in 220 constituency across the country.

May
2 May: Nana Konadu Agyeman Rawlings former first lady of Ghana, becomes first person to pick up a form to seek the presidential nomination of the ruling party (NDC).
5 May: John Atta Mills president of Ghana picked up his nomination form to seek for re-election as leader of the NDC.
10 May: Dr Ekwow Spio-Garbrah, CEO of the Commonwealth Telecommunications Organisation (CTO), picks up nomination forms to contest for the leadership of the NDC.
31 May: President John Atta Mills submits form to NDC executives, to contest the 2011 National Democratic Congress presidential primaries

June
1 June: Nana Konadu Agyeman Rawlings former first lady of Ghana, submits her forms to the NDC executives becoming the second candidate to contest the 2011 National Democratic Congress presidential primaries
3 June: The Ghana national football team, the Black Stars, beat their Congolese counterparts by 3 goals to 1. Goals scored by Isaac Vorsah, Prince Tagoe and Agyeman Badu.
4 June: June 4 revolution commemorated in Accra.

July
8 July: President John Atta Mills is elected by the NDC as it flagbearer for the 2012 presidential elections.

National holidays
Holidays in italics are "special days", while those in regular type are "regular holidays".
 January 1: New Year's Day
 March 6: Independence Day
 April 22 Good Friday
 May 1: Labor Day
 December 25: Christmas
 December 26: Boxing day

In addition, several other places observe local holidays, such as the foundation of their town. These are also "special days."

Births

Deaths
23 July: Larry Bimi - Chairman of the NCCE

References

 
Years of the 21st century in Ghana
Ghana
2010s in Ghana
Ghana